Martin Janco (born 25 January 1995) is a Slovak footballer who currently plays for Dubnica as a forward.

Club career

Spartak Myjava
Janco made his professional Fortuna Liga debut for Spartak Myjava on 28 February 2015 against Spartak Trnava.

References

External links
 Spartak Myjava profile
 
 Futbalnet profile

1995 births
Living people
Slovak footballers
Association football forwards
FK Dubnica players
Spartak Myjava players
FK Slovan Duslo Šaľa players
ŠK Senec players
MŠK Rimavská Sobota players
Slovak Super Liga players
Expatriate footballers in Poland
Sportspeople from Považská Bystrica